Michael Egnor is a pediatric neurosurgeon, advocate of the theory of intelligent design and blogger at the Discovery Institute. He is a professor at the Department of Neurological Surgery at Stony Brook University, a position held since 1991.

Education
Egnor completed medical school at Columbia University.

Intelligent design
Egnor rejected evolutionary theory after reading Michael Denton's book Evolution: A Theory in Crisis and said "claims of evolutionary biologists go wildly beyond the evidence." In 2007 he joined the Discovery Institute's Evolution News & Views blog.

Biologist Jerry Coyne responded to Egnor's article by saying that Egnor accepted widely discredited claims (claims recanted by Denton himself in a later book) and "Egnor is decades out of date and shows no sign of knowing anything at all about evolutionary biology in the 21st century." Egnor later published a series of comprehensive articles on Discovery Institute responding to Coyne's remarks. Egnor is a signatory to the Discovery Institute intelligent design campaign A Scientific Dissent From Darwinism and Physicians and Surgeons who Dissent from Darwinism.

In March 2007, when the Alliance for Science sponsored an essay contest for high school students on the topic "Why I would want my doctor to have studied evolution," Egnor responded by posting an essay on the Discovery Institute's intelligent design blog claiming that evolution was irrelevant to medicine. Burt Humburg criticized him on the blog Panda's Thumb citing the benefits of evolution to medicine and, contrary to Egnor's claim, that doctors do study evolution.

Egnor appeared in Expelled: No Intelligence Allowed. In the film, Ben Stein describes this as "Darwinists were quick to try and exterminate this new threat," and Egnor says he was shocked by the "viciousness" and "baseness" of the response. The website Expelled Exposed, created by the National Center for Science Education (NCSE), responded by saying that Egnor must never have been on the Internet before.

In September 2021 Egnor debated Matt Dillahunty.

Medical work
In 2005 Egnor operated on a young boy whose head was crushed by his father's SUV. The case was reported in Newsday, Good Morning America and New York magazine.

Personal life
Egnor has four children and resides in Stony Brook, New York with his wife. Egnor is a Catholic.

References

External links
Michael Egnor at Stony Brook University

American Roman Catholics
Discovery Institute fellows and advisors
Intelligent design advocates
Living people
Columbia University Vagelos College of Physicians and Surgeons alumni
Stony Brook University faculty
American neurosurgeons
Year of birth missing (living people)